The spermatic plexus (or testicular plexus) is derived from the renal plexus, receiving branches from the aortic plexus. It accompanies the internal spermatic artery to the testis.

Additional images

References

External links

Nerve plexus
Nerves of the torso